In the Morse Code of Brake Lights is the eighth studio album by Canadian indie rock band the New Pornographers, released on September 27, 2019. The album was preceded in August by its lead single, "Falling Down the Stairs of Your Smile".

Following his absence from 2017's Whiteout Conditions, Dan Bejar‘s indefinite departure from the band was confirmed in the press release for this album. Nonetheless, he is listed as a co-composer on the track “Need Some Giants”.

Critical response
The album received generally positive reviews from critics. Daniel Sylvester of Exclaim! rated the album 7 out of 10, writing that "the fact that all 11 of the LP's songs were written by one person slightly hampers the album's sense of adventure, and [Neko] Case's phrasings no longer pop and stand out like they used to. Unfortunately, the octet's attempts to add musical flair to each song draws mixed reactions, as the synthetic strings of "Colossus of Rhodes" and "Leather on the Seat" give each song depth, but feel too high in the mix, to the point of distraction. But despite any nitpicky issues one may find with In the Morse Code of Brake Lights, it's refreshing to see the New Pornographers, 20 years into their existence, still trying to swing for the fences."

For Rolling Stone, Will Hermes gave the album five out of five stars: "the hooks and the lyrics are as sharp as ever, too, the latter functioning as part anxious messages-in-bottles, part baroque bubblegum life preservers. It’s panic-attack pop, fretting its way through vintage good-time chord changes, and letting us know we’re not alone."

Track listing

Personnel
A.C. Newman – vocals, guitar
Neko Case – vocals
John Collins – bass
Blaine Thurier – keyboards, synthesizer
Todd Fancey – lead guitar
Kathryn Calder – vocals, keyboards, guitar
Joe Seiders – drums, vocals
Simi Stone – violin, vocals, percussion

Charts

References

2019 albums
The New Pornographers albums
Albums produced by A. C. Newman
Concord Music Group albums